Joseph Ti Kang (7 May 1928 – 29 December 2022) was a Taiwanese Roman Catholic prelate who served as the archbishop of Taipei from 1989 to 2004. He was born in Xinxiang, China. He became Bishop of Kiayi, and was succeeded by Bishop Joseph Cheng Tsai-fa, who was originally  Bishop of Tainan.

Ti-kang served as the chairman of Fu Jen Catholic University from 1993 to 1999.

Ti-kang died of a cerebral haemorrhage on 29 December 2022, at the age of 94.

References

External links

1928 births
2022 deaths 
People from Jiaozuo
20th-century Roman Catholic bishops in Taiwan
20th-century Roman Catholic archbishops in Taiwan
21st-century Roman Catholic archbishops in Taiwan
Bishops appointed by Pope Paul VI
Taiwanese people from Henan